Asfondilitis (Greek: Ασφοντυλίτης) is an abandoned ancient village in the Greek island of Amorgos. The settlement is in the middle of Megali Strata, an old path connecting Aegiali to Chora.

Before the World War II the village used to be an important agriculture place on Amorgos. Asfondilitis offers a view on the south part of Amorgos and the Aegean Sea.

The rock paintings 
The village is also known for its stone paintings, made by a disabled child, Michalis Roussos, between 1897 to 1943. 

Michalis enjoyed painting dancers, festivals and musicians. However, his favorite theme was women. The name "Dafnoula" can is carved in numerous stones around the village. He also carved crosses, single or in sets of three. They were meant to protect the village from evil.

References 

Amorgos